Kelly Morgan (born 17 June 1980) is a former British boxer. She won the WBC female silver middleweight belt in June 2016. Prior to taking up boxing, she represented the England development team in netball, and represented England and the United Kingdom in the javelin throw.

Sports

Javelin 

Morgan won the English schools junior girls title in 1994, then a year later at age 15 won the AAA under 20 title, resulting in her being called up to the British junior squad. Injury caused her to miss two seasons, but she retook the AAA under 20 title in 1998, and represented the UK in the World Junior Championships.

Morgan required multiple cortisone injections to get through the 2002 season, and had an operation to shave away part of the acromion process towards the end of that year. That operation led to a secondary problem, however, and as a result she did not compete in 2003. Instead she intended to focus on the 2004 Olympic Games, but was unable to overcome her injuries to be able to compete.

Netball 

In 2001, Morgan competed for the English development team in netball, playing against the world champion Australian team.

Boxing 

Morgan started amateur boxing while in the British Army in 2007, but only had a small number of fights due to Army commitments. However, in July 2015, she switched to professional boxing, winning her first five bouts, including against world number two Szilvia Szabados, and claiming the World Boxing Council's silver middleweight belt.

Morgan has been looking to challenge for a world title since July 2016, and after a "very frustrating" time attempting to arrange a title fight, in January 2017 the World Boxing Council ordered its super-middleweight champion, Nikki Adler, to face Morgan. In February 2017, the WBC told Morgan she could fight for the "vacant title", with her manager stating it was unclear whether Adler had vacated the title or been stripped of it. However, before she was able to fight for the title, Morgan was forced to retire from boxing due to a sparring injury leading to fourth nerve palsy.

Personal life 

Morgan was born in Dover and brought up in Durrington, Wiltshire. The daughter of Sarah, who played netball, and Russ, an amateur boxer and Army physical training instructor, she tried a large number of sports before finding a niche with the javelin.

Outside of sport, Morgan was in the Royal Air Force until 2000, when she left to concentrate on javelin. At the end of 2001 she rejoined the armed forces, this time in the British Army, where she served until 2012, reaching the rank of sergeant in the Royal Army Physical Training Corps.

Between leaving the army and beginning her boxing career, Morgan spent some time travelling, including working as a personal trainer in Qatar.

Results

Javelin

Boxing

References

External links 
 

1980 births
Living people
English female javelin throwers
Commonwealth Games medallists in athletics
Commonwealth Games bronze medallists for England
Athletes (track and field) at the 2002 Commonwealth Games
English women boxers
Royal Army Physical Training Corps soldiers
English netball players
British female javelin throwers
Middleweight boxers
20th-century Royal Air Force personnel
20th-century British Army personnel
21st-century British Army personnel
People from Dover, Kent
Military personnel from Kent
Medallists at the 2002 Commonwealth Games